Turneria dahlii is a species of ant in the genus Turneria. Described by Forel in 1901, the species is endemic to New Guinea, the Solomon Islands and Vanuatu.

References

Dolichoderinae
Insects described in 1901
Insects of New Guinea